The Facultad de Derecho Eugenio Maria de Hostos (English: Eugenio María de Hostos School of Law) was a law school located in Mayagüez, Puerto Rico.  The School was founded by Fernando Bayrón, Juan Mari Brás and Carlos Rivera Lugo in 1995. The institution lost its ABA accreditation, and then the Puerto Rico Supreme Court also withdrew the accreditation due to school's economical difficulties. After having granted degrees to 900 alumni, Hostos closed in 2013, when the last commencement ceremony had only eight graduates, out of ten students in their final semester. The Eugenio Maria de Hostos Law School (or, Hostos Law School, for short) aspired to achieve the development of a legal professional who was also responsive to the needs of their communities and who would embrace the Hostos educational philosophy.

History

Accreditation 
On 28 October 1996, the parent institution of the school, the Eugenio María de Hostos Law School Foundation (FFDEMH, for its initials in Spanish), requested an accreditation extension from the Supreme Court of Puerto Rico. A committee for such a purpose was named by the Court on 20 December. The committee submitted its final report which did not recommend accreditation, on 11 July of the following year. Two observations made by the committee were that the institution lacked the financial means to operate and the academic profiles of its students were subpar compared to other law schools in Puerto Rico.

The American Bar Association (ABA) denied the school's request for a provisional accreditation on 15 July 1997. This was detrimental, since Puerto Rican law requires that to be accepted into the Bar, all persons must have graduated from an ABA-accredited institution. As such, on 13 August, the Supreme Court released a resolution refusing entry into the bar to the first cohorts of graduates. However, the Supreme Court also resolved that these graduates were able to take the bar examination in September 1997, to obtain data from the test results. Only 36% of the class passed the examination, compared to 79% of the University of Puerto Rico School of Law, 63% from the Interamerican University, and 61% of the Pontificial Catholic University of Puerto Rico School of Law graduates on their first attempt.

Consequentially, the Supreme Court released a second resolution were they established their worry that the Hostos Law School lacked the "budgetary soundness", had difficulties in recluting students who were able to pass the bar examination post-graduation, as well as not having obtained the provisional accreditation from ABA. The Supreme Court, on a 4–2 vote on the resolution, gave a second opportunity to Hostos, having been persuaded by a promise from the institution that there would be "significant improvement" on the bar examination results between 1998-1999 "if [the Supreme Court] gave said graduates the opportunity of taking the bar examination." If Hostos delivered on their promise, as well as obtaining at least one provisional accreditation from ABA, in two years time, then the Supreme Court would grant the requested accreditation. If said requirements were not satisfied the Supreme Court would refuse the accreditation request and not accept any graduates for the bar examination from 2000 on. Additionally, the Supreme Court requested that all enrolled students and all students admitted from 1 April 1998 be individually notified of the Court's second resolution and its implications for the Hostos Law School.

The Hostos' Application Provisional Accreditation Committee of the American Bar Association visited the institution between March 7–10, 1999.

After the two years lapsed, the institution had not satisfied the two conditions, including having inferior bar examination rates compared to the other three accredited law schools, as well as having been denied the provisional accreditation from ABA for a second time on 24 November 1999.

The Supreme Court denied the accreditation and stated that no graduates would be permitted to take the bar examinations from 2000 and on. However, those who had failed the tests from 1997 to 1999 were able to reattempt the bar examination. The Court argumented that "[a]fter seven years from having been founded... it is not justified that [the Court] continue making exceptions to...norms and regulations...that are required of any other applicant." On a particular vote made by the Associate Justice Jaime Fuster Berlingeri mentioned that Hostos had an "irreparable medullar problem" in achieving its goals. He credited this to the incapacity of recluting capable students of passing the bar examination. Fuster Berlingeri added the results for the law school entrance exam, the Graduate Studies Admissions Test (PAEG, for Prueba de Admisión a Estudios Graduados). The Hostos Law School alleged that they "could not reclute better students for lack of accreditation." Fuster Berlingeri refuted this by suggesting that the most probable cause was the geographic location, where there were less students in the region for a fourth law school. Out of all the passing marks of the bar exams offered in the month of September in the years 1997 to 1999, only 12% came from the 16 municipalities in the western region of Puerto Rico, which meant that even if the Hostos could reclute all students from it region, it would still be a small part of the general law school market. 54% of all Hostos graduates who took the bar exam were not from the region and 85% of these graduates also lacked the average PAEG score of those who did pass. Even though the cost for three years attendance was at least $100,000, the institution had to resort to donations to keep itself afloat.

The Hostos Law School did not request a reconsideration from the Supreme Court.  On March 9, 2000, the Court expanded the time window to students who had taken the bar exam in March 2000 to be admitted to the bar as well.

2003 Provisional Accreditation 
Hostos resubmitted a request for provisional accreditation in the Supreme Court on 13 December 2002. The Court decided to name a Committee of Accreditation, composed of:

 Jorge Pérez Díaz, Esq. (Chair)
 Dr. José R. González
 Rafael Martínez, CPA
 Dr. Efraín González Tejera
 José Sosa Llorens, Esq.
 James P. White (Counsel to the committee)-former ABA consultant

The committee submitted its final report on 19 June 2003. On the 27 the Court, through a resolution, decided to grant Hostos a five-year provisional accreditation. This was subject to the following conditions:

 Admissions-Hostos would have to maintain an admittance policy of a minimum of 500 on the PAEG and, from 2003–07, increase the rate of admitted students to 70% to those who have over the score of 550.
 Administration and Financial Situation-required that by the end of the year 2003, Hostos name an Associate Dean of Finance and an Associate Dean of Academic and Student Affairs, as well as pay their overdue debts and implement realistic financial plans.
 Faculty-by 30 June 2004, Hostos would have to adopt a professional development plan, whereby the faculty would be able to do their post-graduate studies and investigations in multiple universities.
 Library-the Law School would have to acquire the necessary law collections and provide them for public use and submit a plan for a permanent library site at the side of the permanent building on Peral Street, since the library was lodged at a rented site on the José de Diego Street.
 Bar exam results-from May 2006 on, the rate of graduates who passed the bar exam on their first attempt would not be less than 75% of the lowest score of any of the other three accredited law schools. For the classes of 2007 and '08, the rate would be 80% and 85%, respectively.
 ABA Accreditation-By 31 June 2007, Hostos must have obtained either a provisional or permanent accreditation from the American Bar Association.
 Progress Reports-the Board of Trustees would have to submit progress reports on all conditions every 31 January and July every year from 2004 on.

All students, at the time presently enrolled, or who enrolled in the future, would be handed a copy of these conditions as well as a Memorandum of Understanding between the Supreme Court and Hostos Law School. In addition, all graduates from December 2003 on would be able to take the bar examinations. Finally, the resolution stated that Hostos had ninety days to submit a proposed plan to offer a course for all those who graduated from September 1999, when it lost its original accreditation, ableing them to take the bar exams.

The final plan for the course, titled "Legislation and Jurisprudence Analysis Preparatory Program", for all those who did graduate when the institution was not accredited was referred to the Committee of Accreditation set up by the Court. The program consisted of "an intensive study and discussion program of the 13 subjects that are the object of evaluation in the general law examination." Since this cohort of students had below average PAEG scored and graduated from a non-accredited institution, the Court required, that after completing the preparatory course, graduates must be recertified by Hostos. However, the Committee rejected the Hostos proposal that these students obtain at least 70% in the program as a condition for their re-certification. The Court adopted all of the committee's recommendations on 12 March 2004.

Attempted Revivals 
In early 2013, the Hostos graduate and then-representative María T. González López submitted a joint resolution in an attempt to make Hostos a subsidiary faculty of the University of Puerto Rico, Mayagüez Campus. The joint resolution would have reaffirmed Joint Resolution 500 of 2001, which made Hostos a quasi-public institution as well as instruct both chambers of the legislature as well as the executive branch to name their representatives to the Board of Trustees and initiate talks with the University of Puerto Rico as well as its Mayagüez Campus to transfer the institution to them so they could salvage it by becoming part of an accredited institution. Additionally, it would have resolved a $1.5 million disbursement from the legislature for Hostos. It was later retracted by González López herself.

In the Fall of 2016, the Municipality of Mayagüez and the Interamerican University of Puerto Rico signed a first of two agreements to reopen the Hostos Law School. The groups accorded that the Interamerican University would be able to incorporate the use of the name of Hostos to offer continuing education for lawyers, a Master's in law and a bachelor's in criminal justice. The University would offer an online database as a library to students and would request accreditation so that it would operate as an extension of the Law Faculty and their San Germán campus. This new setup would commence offering courses in August 2017. The second agreement, to be signed two weeks after the first one, was to allow the Interamerican University rehabilitation and use of the Hostos building.

Building

The permanent seat of the Eugenio Maria de Hostos School of Law located in the building formerly occupied and known as the Luis Muñoz Rivera elementary public school. It was built in 1924, when Juan Rullán Rivera was mayor of the city of Mayagüez.  The site was originally occupied by the Municipal Slaughterhouse during the early 19th century. For this reason the current street of the school, Georgina Morales, was known as "La Calle de la Carnicería" or slaughterhouse street. By 1848, the municipal prison building was built which gave its name to the Barrio where today the Eugenio María de Hostos School of Law was located.

The building was designed by Rafael Carmoega, whose other works include the Capitol of Puerto Rico, the School of Tropical Medicine (Escuela de Medicina Tropical), the old Casino de Puerto Rico, and the first buildings of the University of Puerto Rico, Rio Piedras Campus. The architectural style of the building is mostly modernist, with elegant, although reserved, neoclassical accents including its access facade that is a Doric order of columns.

The public elementary school closed down in 1985. The remodeling design of the building was the work of Mayagüez architect Juan Manuel Moscoso. The property was restored and rehabilitated to house the law school by the Mayagüez Municipal Government during the years 1997 to 1999, under the mayoralty José Guillermo Rodríguez. The building was inaugurated as the permanent seat of the law school on May 7, 1999. In November 2006, then-governor of Puerto Rico Aníbal Acevedo Vilá, took part in a cornerstone laying ceremony for a new building to house the law library right next to the Hostos building. Acevedo Vilá highlighted the social work offered by Hostos through its legal aid clinic and announced an annual $1.5 million allocation for the building of the library for the next five years, until 2010, creating between 25 and 30 jobs. The building, which would have taken 13 months to complete, would have consisted of a three-storey building with 37,433 square feet to house Hostos' 180,000 volumes. In March 2013, a fire started in one of the abandoned residences, however, no persons were affected nor were they evictions. In 2014, after Hostos had its accreditation rescinded for the final time, the mayor Guillermo Rodríguez requested that the building be returned to the municipality since it had been abandoned and had become a "vandal den."

Crime Victims Help Center 
On July 7, 2020, the Municipality and the Interamerican University of Puerto Rico announced the use of the Hostos building as the seat of a joint venture to provide a help center for crime victims (CAVIC-May, for Centro de Apoyo a Victimas del Crimen-Mayagüez) of the 23 municipalities in the western and southwestern regions of the island. $846,458 of the funds came from Victims of Crime Act (VOCA) and $211,615 from institutional funds, for a total of $1,058,073. The aim is to provide is assist primary and secondary victims of sex-related crimes in overcoming the damages they suffered as a result of those crimes. The clinic will also provide aid to victims of crimes ranging from arsony to discrimantion based on intellectial disability, as well as coordinate workshops with other government agencies.

Competitions
Eugenio Maria de Hostos Law School students were winners of the XVIII Miguel Velázquez Rivera Debate Competition, an annual competition held by the University of Puerto Rico School of Law Review. The competition included students from all law schools in Puerto Rico, and measured legal knowledge matter. Hostos had also won three previous editions of the competition for the years 2001, 2006 and 2009.

Hostos students were also the victors in the inaugural edition of the Enrique Miranda Merced Interuniversity Litigation Competition in 2010, held by the University of Puerto Rico School of Law Litigation Student Association. It counted with participation from both institutions who went head-to-head through two rounds, where Hostos took the role of prosecutors and then the role of the defendants to prove their knowledge and capabilities relating to the criminal code.

Financial Situation 
The Hostos Law School started off in 1993 with $12,144 of total assets, this reached an all-time high in 2011 of $11,199,337, a year after it got its accreditation rescinded by the Supreme Court of Puerto Rico.

Ni una vida más para la toga 
Ni una vida más para la toga (or "Not one more life for the toga") was an academic colloquim sponsored and held by Hostos for the "critical and interdisciplinary reflection particularly on the field[s] of State and Law." Started in 2003 by invitation of Dr. Daniel Nina to his peers to discuss a 1993 essay of the same name by the founding dean Dr. Carlos Rivera Lugo. The name is a play on the anti-drug campaign slogan Ni una vida más para las drogas ("Not one more life for drugs). Speakers included Noam Chomsky, Enrique Dussel, Boaventura de Sousa Santos, Raúl Zibechi, Jesús Alí de la Torre, Edward James Olmos and Samuel Silva Gotay. In 2007 a book of the same name was released by Dr. Nina in Utuado containing ten of the speeches given in their inaugural edition.

Notable faculty 

 Ana Aliende Urtasun-visiting professor.
 Fernando Bayrón Toro-jurist, historian, novelist and politician.
 Iris M. Camacho Meléndez-student affairs coordinator and director of legal aid clinic at Hostos, now Student Dean at the IUPR, School of Law.
 Federico Cedó Alzamora-Official Historian of Mayagüez and former representative of the municipality in the Board of Trustees.
 José A. Cuevas Segarra-former member of the Board of Trustees.
 Carlos del Valle Cruz.
 Rolando Emmanuelli Jiménez-author and photographer.
 Juan Mari Brás-founder.
 José O. Marrero Alvarado-higher education administrator of the Ana G. Méndez University and consultant.
 Víctor “Vitín” Negrón Padilla-professor on municipal law and former member of the Board of Trustees.
 Daniel Nina Estrella-founding coordinator of Ni una vida más para la toga colloqium.
 Milagros Martínez Mercado-Ponce-based family lawyer.
 Derik V. Molinary Cortés (JD '08)-Moca-based domestic violence lawyer, also worked with the Fundación Mujer de F. E.
 Lizbeth J. Rivera Morales (JD '99)-founding director of the Hostos legal assistance clinic.
 Luis Rivera Román-Visiting Professor and now-retired judge.
 Santos Alfonso Silva Sernaqué-coordinator of the Barcos de Papel legal magazine.
 Eduardo Vázquez Bote Ph.D.- author and recipient of Cruz de San Raimundo de Peñafort.
 Jorge Velázquez Hernández-Puerto Rico bar exam tutor and critic.

Notable alumni 

Lutgardo Acevedo López (JD '10)-CPA and convicted of manslaughter.
Eric Alfaro Calero-one-term Representative and last Commissioner of Municipal Affairs.
Yanira Belén Cruz (JD '08)-Metropistas in-house counsel. 
Lersy G. Boria Vizcarrondo-Women's Attorney of Puerto Rico and former Secretary of DACO.
José Luis Dalmau Santiago (JD '97)-five term Senator.
Militza de Jesús de Jesús (JD '10)-businesswoman, former legislative advisor and superior judge of the Court of first instance.
María Lizzette Gaud Vélez (JD '04)-Mayagüez municipal legislator and director of the RUM Natatorium. 
María Teresa González López-one term Representative.
Venus M. Melvin Quiles-divorce lawyer and businesswoman.
Pablo L. Morán Ortiz (JD '07)-activist with cerebral palsy, co-recipient of the 2007 Sandra Zaiter Award. Not to be confused with the queer Mexican stand-up comedian and co-star of Netflix's Zona Rosa of the same name.
Dorisselle Pérez Dwyer (JD '05)-pharmacist with Shire Plc and Ehlers-Danlos syndrome activist.
Sheila Rivera Vazquez (JD '11)-Texas-based immigration lawyer.
Gilberto Rodríguez Valle-one term Senator.
Santos Ruiz Cordero (JD '08)-medical doctor.
José A. Silva Riollano (JD '08)-professor of the Foundation for Advanced Studies and Investigations (FUNDESI) and lawyer in the famous "The Three Innocents of Aguada" case.
Aníbal José Torres Torres (JD '01)-two term Senator and Chair of the Popular Democratic Party of Puerto Rico.

Notes

References

 
 
 
 
 

Education in Mayagüez, Puerto Rico
Law schools in Puerto Rico
Educational institutions established in 1995
Educational institutions disestablished in 2013
Modernist architecture in Puerto Rico
Neoclassical architecture in Puerto Rico
Unaccredited institutions of higher learning in the United States
1995 establishments in Puerto Rico
2013 disestablishments in Puerto Rico
Defunct private universities and colleges in Puerto Rico
Defunct law schools